Edward Earl Johnson (June 22, 1960 – May 20, 1987) was a man convicted in 1979 at the age of 18 and subsequently executed by the U.S. state of Mississippi for the murder of a policeman, J.T. Trest, and the sexual assault of a 69-year-old woman, Sally Franklin. Throughout his eight years on death row, he continued to plead his innocence. Johnson was executed by gas chamber.

Life
Johnson was born on June 22, 1960, at the University of Mississippi Medical Center in Jackson, Mississippi. He was born six weeks premature and spent the first month of his life in an incubator at the hospital. He later lived in Walnut Grove, Carthage, Mississippi.

Documentary
His case came to international attention when he was featured in the BBC documentary Fourteen Days in May. Broadcast in 1987, the documentary showed the last two weeks of Johnson's life. It starts on May 6, the day that Johnson learns the date of his execution. During interviews, Johnson said that his confession was forced by police in a deserted wood whilst they were threatening to shoot him.

Throughout the documentary he also raised the point of the sexual assault victim saying during the police lineup that he was not the man who raped her and pointed to another individual.

In the time since execution occurred, Johnson's lawyers located a woman who claimed to have an alibi for Johnson, being with him during the time of the crime. She volunteered her testimony at the courthouse but was supposedly told to "go home and mind her own business".

Execution
In spite of British lawyer Clive Stafford Smith's attempts for a reprieve, Johnson was executed. The documentary team was given access to him until minutes before the execution was carried out. A follow-up documentary by Stafford Smith claimed to prove conclusively that Johnson was innocent and had been framed by the police.

He was pronounced dead at 12:06 a.m. on May 20, 1987, after being put to death in the gas chamber of what was then called Parchman Prison Farm. Johnson's final statements echoed his wait for a stay of execution, he stated "Well, I guess no one is going to call. OK, let's get this over with."

Don Cabana, the warden of Parchman Prison Farm following Johnson's execution became outspoken about abolishing the death penalty because in his understanding an innocent man was executed.

It was the second execution by the state of Mississippi since the Gregg v. Georgia decision, the first being that of Jimmy Lee Gray, and the 72nd overall in the United States.

See also
 Capital punishment in Mississippi
 Capital punishment in the United States
 List of people executed in Mississippi

References

General
 U.S. Executions Since 1976. The Clark County Prosecuting Attorney. Retrieved on 2007-11-12.
 Thomas, Merrilyn (1991). Life on Death Row: One man's fight against racism and the death penalty. Paladin, UK. .
 Johnson v. Thigpen, . Retrieved on 2007-11-12.
 Solotoroff, Ivan (2001). "The Last Face You'll Ever See: The Private Life Of The American Death Penalty". Harper Collins U.S. 

1960 births
1987 deaths
20th-century African-American people
20th-century executions by Mississippi
20th-century executions of American people
American people executed for murdering police officers
American rapists
Executed African-American people
People convicted of murder by Mississippi
People executed by Mississippi by gas chamber
People from Walnut Grove, Mississippi